UB10 may refer to:

 UB10, a postcode district in the UB postcode area
 SM UB-10, a World War I German submarine